U. S. Steel Košice, s.r.o. is a steel company located in Košice, Slovakia.

In November 2000, the ownership of the complete metallurgical operation of former Východoslovenské železiarne (VSŽ) Košice (East Slovakian Ironworks, Košice) was transferred to U.S. Steel.

See also 
 Uzhhorod - Košice broad gauge track

External links

Companies based in Košice
Steel companies of Slovakia
Manufacturing companies of Slovakia
U.S. Steel
Manufacturing companies of Czechoslovakia